Dr. Juan Plate Airport  is an airport serving the city of Puerto Vallemi in Concepción Department, Paraguay.

See also

 List of airports in Paraguay
 Transport in Paraguay

References

External links
 HERE Maps - Puerto Vallemi
 OpenStreetMap - Puerto Vallemi
 OurAirports - Puerto Vallemi Airport
 Puerto Vallemi
 Skyvector Aeronautical Charts - Puerto Vallemi

Airports in Paraguay